The 5Y3 is a medium-power directly heated full-wave rectifier vacuum tube introduced by RCA in 1935.  It has found wide use in tube radios and early guitar amplifiers (of the Fender Champ type).  It is virtually identical, electrically, to the older four-pin type 80 tube, but with an octal base. 5Y3G, 5Y3GT, and 5Y3WGTA are variants with essentially the same specification; the 6087 is similar and a plug-in replacement, but with indirectly heated cathode.

RCA and other manufacturers later introduced many similar 5V rectifier tubes of both higher and lower current and voltage rating, including the 5V3, 5W3, 5X3, 5Z3, 5U4, 5Z4, GZ32, and GZ34.

As for a suitable replacement, the 5Y4G has same specifications as the 5Y3G but with a different pin out.

Sovtek in Russia manufacture a 5Y3GT with similar specifications, but indirectly heated, and with higher maximum current at 140 instead of 120 mA.

See also
List of vacuum tubes

References

External links
 http://www.r-type.org/pdfs/5y3gt.pdf  General Electric datasheet
http://frank.pocnet.net/sheets/127/5/5Y3GT.pdf Tung-Sol 5Y3GT datasheet
http://frank.pocnet.net/sheets/049/5/5Y3G.pdf RCA 5Y3G & 5Y3GT datasheet
http://www.svetlana.com/pdf/sovtek/5y3gt-sovtek.pdf Sovtek 5Y3GT datasheet

Vacuum tubes
Guitar amplification tubes